Joey Rive (born July 8, 1963) is a former professional tennis player from the United States.  He was born in Santurce, Puerto Rico.

Rive achieved a career-high singles ranking of world No. 57 in 1988.

During his career Rive finished runner-up in 4 doubles events.  His highest doubles ranking was world No. 48, reached in 1989.

He was the head tennis coach at the University of Alabama for the Alabama Crimson Tide for 3 seasons, 1995-1997, and at TCU from 2001-2006.

Career finals

Doubles (4 losses)

External links
 
 

American male tennis players
American people of Puerto Rican descent
Florida State Seminoles men's tennis players
Alabama Crimson Tide men's tennis coaches
People from Fort Worth, Texas
Sportspeople from San Juan, Puerto Rico
Tennis people from Texas
Tennis players at the 1991 Pan American Games
Pan American Games medalists in tennis
1963 births
Living people
Pan American Games gold medalists for Puerto Rico
Medalists at the 1991 Pan American Games
American tennis coaches